Zinc finger protein 35 is a protein that in humans is encoded by the ZNF35 gene.

See also
 Zinc finger

References

External links
 

Transcription factors